Steinar Løding (born 3 April 1950) is a Norwegian novelist. Among his novels are Glomma brenner from 1982, Erindringens tre from 1992, and Jernalderdrøm. Første bok. Flukten fra Ninive from 1997. He was awarded the Gyldendal's Endowment in 1992, shared with Sissel Lie.

References

1950 births
People from Molde
20th-century Norwegian novelists
21st-century Norwegian novelists
Living people